Diaperia candida, common names silver pygmycudweed and silver rabbit-tobacco, is a plant species in the sunflower family, native to the south-central part of the United States: Texas, western Louisiana, southwestern Arkansas, southeastern Oklahoma.

Diaperia candida is an annual herb with leaves that appear silvery because of woolly hairs pressed against the surface. One plant generally has several small flower heads. Flowers bloom March to June. Its habitats include oak and pine woodlands, prairies, and coastal areas.

References

Gnaphalieae
Flora of the United States
Plants described in 1842
Taxa named by Asa Gray
Taxa named by John Torrey